Antichloris viridis, the satin stowaway or banana moth, is a moth of the family Erebidae. The species was first described by Herbert Druce in 1884. It is found in Colombia, Panama, Nicaragua and Venezuela. It has also been observed a number of times in Great Britain, after being accidentally imported in fruit consignments.

The larvae feed on banana, and are considered a serious pest in some areas.

References

Moths described in 1884
Euchromiina
Moths of North America
Moths of South America